The 1995–96 season of the Norwegian Premier League, the highest bandy league for men in Norway.

10 games were played, with 2 points given for wins and 1 for draws. Stabæk IF won the league. No team was relegated, as SK Frem-31 survived a relegation playoff, and the league was expanded with one team ahead of the next season.

League table

References

Seasons in Norwegian bandy
1995 in bandy
1996 in bandy
Band
Band